La'Diviosia Gerell Robinson (born October 13, 1989), known as Gerell Robinson, is a former professional football tight end in the National Football League. He also played for Arizona State University and Hamilton High School mainly as a wide receiver.

College career 
Robinson was heavily recruited player nationally, ultimately committing to Arizona State University on January 5, 2008 and sign a letter of intent on February 6, 2008. At ASU, he would play wide receiver across from high school teammate Kerry Taylor, who would also go into the NFL, under newly installed Dennis Erickson.

During the 2008 and 2009 seasons, Robinson would receive limited action taking rolls on special teams. The 2009 season introduced Robinson into ASU's offense at wide receiver ending the season 4th overall in catches and yards. On special teams, his performance would increase with 2 tackles with 1 assist and forced fumble against Washington State University.

Missing the season opener in 2010 due to a hamstring injury preseason, Robinson returned to the active roster the next game. The most notable performance was against 5th ranked Oregon State University leading ASU with 7 catches for 84 yards.

His senior year were marked with career highs in all statistical including a record breaking MAACO Bowl Las Vegas with 13 catches for 241 yard against Boise State University 56-24 loss. By the end of the 2011 season, Robinson's 77 catches would place him 3rd highest single season for ASU and 2nd highest in single season yards of 1,397.

Professional career

Denver Broncos
Robinson signed with the Denver Broncos as an undrafted free agent following the 2012 NFL Draft. Robinson failed to make the team's final roster cut, and was subsequently released by the organization. Shortly after, he was signed to the practice squad of the Arizona Cardinals. He was then re-signed to the practice squad of the Denver Broncos.

Cleveland Browns
Robinson was signed by the Cleveland Browns on September 9, 2014. Robinson was waived by the Cleveland Browns on October 18, 2014 and subsequently re-signed by the club three days later on October 21, 2014.

Miami Dolphins
In October 2014, he was signed by the Miami Dolphins to their practice squad and on December 16, 2014, he was promoted to their active roster.

References

External links
NFL Combine profile
Arizona State Sun Devils bio

1989 births
Living people
Players of American football from Gary, Indiana
American football wide receivers
American football tight ends
Arizona State Sun Devils football players
Denver Broncos players
Arizona Cardinals players
Cleveland Browns players
Miami Dolphins players